The Dřevnice is a river in the Czech Republic. It is a left tributary of the Morava River. It originates in the Vizovice Highlands (Vizovická vrchovina) upland at the elevation of 560 m and flows to Otrokovice, where it enters the Morava River. It is 41.6 km long, and its basin area is 435 km2.

It flows through Kašava, Březová, Slušovice, Lípa, Želechovice nad Dřevnicí, Zlín and Otrokovice. The Slušovice Dam is constructed on the river.

References 

Rivers of the Zlín Region
Zlín District